Álvaro Alberto Espinoza Ramírez [es-pe-noh'-zah] (born February 19, 1962) is a Venezuelan former shortstop in Major League Baseball. He batted and threw right-handed.

Early life
Born in Valencia, Carabobo, he graduated from Pedro Gual High School where he played baseball, soccer and basketball.

Playing career
As a young prospect, Espinoza was let go by the Houston Astros system. But he went on to have twelve decent seasons with the Minnesota Twins (1984–1986), New York Yankees (1988–1991), Cleveland Indians (1993–1996), New York Mets (1996) and Seattle Mariners (1997).

Although a free swinger, Espinoza was a good bat handler and contact hitter.  His game was to simply put the ball in play and not try to hit for power. As a baserunner, he had average speed.

Probably, he was not among the most gifted athletes ever to play shortstop, but he positioned himself extremely well and got to many balls that might have eluded some flashier shortstops. A sure-handed fielder, he had a strong throwing arm and found many ways to turn a double play,  as well as his concentration and knowledge of the game were his main assets.

In a 12-season career, Espinoza hit a .254 average with 22 home runs and 201 RBI in 942 games, including 252 runs, 105 doubles, nine triples, and 13 stolen bases.

Espinoza's was one of New York Yankees public address announcer Bob Sheppard's favorite names to announce.

He was also noted for his bubble gum hat antics, as well as other practical jokes he and teammate Wayne Kirby used to play on the 1995 Cleveland Indians.

Coaching career
Following his playing career after the 1997 season, Espinoza turned to coaching. In 1998, he worked with the Montreal Expos as their minor league infield coordinator.

Hired by the Los Angeles Dodgers organization, Espinoza made his managerial debut in 1999 and guided Class-A Vero Beach to a 48–85 record in the Florida State League. He spent 2000 and 2001 as the Dodgers Minor League Roving Infield Coordinator.

In 2002, Espinoza was signed by the Pittsburgh Pirates and then named their infield Instructor in 2004.

Milestone
Espinoza, Ruppert Jones‚ Dave Kingman‚ Ricky Nelson, Kevin Millar, and José Canseco are the only players to hit a fair ball that got stuck in a stadium obstruction. Jones and Nelson both had hits get caught in the overhead speakers at the old Kingdome. The balls hit by Kingman and Espinoza were at the Minneapolis Metrodome, with Kingman's getting stuck in a drainage valve and Espinoza's lodging in an overhead speaker.

See also
 List of Major League Baseball players from Venezuela

References

External links

Retrosheet
Venezuelan Professional Baseball League
MLB page
The ESPN Baseball Encyclopedia – Gary Gillette, Peter Gammons, Pete Palmer. Publisher: Sterling Publishing, 2005. Format: Paperback, 1824pp. Language: English. 

1962 births
Caribes de Anzoátegui players
Cleveland Indians players
Colorado Springs Sky Sox players
Gulf Coast Astros players
Living people
Major League Baseball players from Venezuela
Major League Baseball shortstops
Minnesota Twins players
Minor league baseball coaches
Minor league baseball managers
Navegantes del Magallanes players
New York Mets players
New York Yankees players
Sportspeople from Valencia, Venezuela
Pittsburgh Pirates coaches
Portland Beavers players
Seattle Mariners players
Tacoma Rainiers players
Tigres de Aragua players
Venezuelan baseball coaches
Venezuelan expatriate baseball players in the United States
Visalia Oaks players
Wisconsin Rapids Twins players